George William Crick (1 December 1888 – 5 April 1982) was an English footballer who played in various defensive positions, for Southampton in the Southern League in 1915.

Football career
Crick was born in Desborough, Northamptonshire and played his early football with various local clubs, including Northampton Town, before joining Market Harborough Town of the Leicestershire Senior League. In May 1914, he and teammate Harry Hall joined Southampton.

Crick initially played in the reserves, before replacing the injured George Hadley at right-half for the Southern League match against Millwall on 23 January 1915. An adaptable player, he made eightfurther appearances as cover for either Hadley, John Denby (at centre-half) or George Green (at right-back).

Following the suspension of league football in 1915, Crick enlisted in the army in December 1915, serving at first with the Northamptonshire Regiment, before transferring to the Machine Gun Corps in May 1917, with whom he earned the Military Medal for gallantry.

After the war, he joined Kettering Town where he remained until 1932, when his career was ended by a cartilage injury. After retiring from football, he worked in the Corby steelworks as a storeman.

References

External links
 Football career details

1888 births
People from Desborough
1982 deaths
English footballers
Association football defenders
Desborough Town F.C. players
Northampton Town F.C. players
Southampton F.C. players
Kettering Town F.C. players
Southern Football League players
British Army personnel of World War I
Recipients of the Military Medal
Northamptonshire Regiment soldiers
Machine Gun Corps soldiers
Military personnel from Northamptonshire